is a Japanese light novel series written by Sarasa Nagase and illustrated by Mai Murasaki. It began serialization online in May 2017 on the user-generated novel publishing website Shōsetsuka ni Narō. It was later acquired by Kadokawa Shoten, who have published ten volumes since September 2017 under their Kadokawa Beans Bunko imprint. A manga adaptation with art by Anko Yuzu was serialized in Kadokawa Shoten's seinen manga magazine Comp Ace from June 2018 to August 2019. It was collected in three tankōbon volumes. Both the light novel and manga are licensed in North America by Yen Press. An anime television series adaptation produced by Maho Film aired from October to December 2022.

Characters

A reincarnated girl from Japan, she recovers her memories from her previous life in which she played the game's original setting. Knowing Aileen is destined to die in the normal course of events, she uses her vast knowledge of the original game in order to avoid her demise, getting closer to Claude who is the one bound to kill her. A diligent, kind and empowered lady, she is shown to not just rely on her knowledge of the game, being politically savvy, a successful businesswoman and a careful tactician, skills she puts to use in order to both avoid danger to herself. But she also propels the land of demons. She has a bit of an inferiority complex towards her brothers, as being the only female meant she did not gain as much attention or recognition, thus she put tremendous effort in her education in order to be acknowledged. However, this ended up ostracizing her from her peers. Although she was viewed with skepticism, her competence along her culinary ability gained her the favor of the demon populace.

Claude is the older brother and former heir to throne who lost his claim to it since a young age, as a result of his natural and immense magical powers. Being deemed a threat, he was sent to live in an old, abandoned castle where he took residence, becoming the lord of the demon kind. Although stoic, and distant to most people, he cares vastly about his subjects, being a beloved ruler and trying his best to improve the lives of his citizens and preserving the non-aggression pact between humans and demons. He slowly begins to open more as a result of his interactions with Aileen, which make him feel flustered, much to his servants' amusement.

The default love interest of the game's heroine in the original setting. Cedric is Claude's younger brother and actual heir to the throne. Although outwardly a charismatic, benevolent prince, in truth Cedric is a narcissistic, petty, self-centered, selfish, entitled noble with a severe inferiority complex to his brother. Frustrated with the fact Claude is more talented than him in everything has made Cedric both tremendously spiteful and fearful of Claude. When Aileen, now with her memories restored, gracefully concedes Cedric's rejection (thereby depriving him of the means to humiliate her in public) along emphasizing she is no longer interested in him, deals a several blow to his ego. This causes him to act more erratically, recklessly and unhinged in trying to antagonize Aileen, oftentimes without forethought which ends up costing him public support. Unable to cope with the fact Aileen not only doesn't love him anymore, but also gets closer to Claude, it makes matters worse as he views it as another "defeat" towards Claude. This pushes Cedric further into the brink and becoming more hostile, and dangerous. He becomes vengeful towards Aileen, and seeks to reclaim her out of personal pride, rather than love.

Claude's assistant and right-hand man who handles more complicated matters like finances and administrative duties. Unlike the vast majority of Claude's domain, Keith is actually human and serves Claude dutifully and faithfully.

One of Claude's main servants. Beelzebuth is a rowdy and rogue man, who is completely loyal to Claude. He normally lacks proper mannerisms and etiquette, but he is willing to learn and adapt so as to not embarrass Claude.

The game's heroine in the original setting, Lilia is also the Holy Sword Maiden, which grants her power effective against demons. An outwardly benevolent, charming, peace-loving girl, she like Aileen is also in truth, a reincarnated girl from Japan. Having played the original game, she tries to use the game's knowledge for vastly opposite ends than Aileen. Being in the role of heroine, she tries her utmost to reap the full benefits of her character, seducing and manipulating different parties, including Cedric, all for self-gain. She tries her utmost to force the game's events to unfold as normal, knowing she stands to win. With Aileen's in-depth knowledge of the game, she is being constantly out maneuvered by Aileen, and eroding her own plans.

A crow in the service of Claude. He is named Almond by Aileen after eating her baked almond sweets. Although somewhat hostile to Aileen, she is easily able to win his favor and get him to do what she wants by bribing him with sweets.

A good friend of Aileen, who constantly helps her in her many schemes and plans and saves her from trouble. It is hinted that he has feelings for Aileen.

A journalist and friend of Aileen.

Media

Light novels
The series by Sarasa Nagase began serialization online on the user-generated novel publishing website Shōsetsuka ni Narō in May 2017. It was acquired by Kadokawa Shoten who began publishing it as a light novel with illustrations by Mai Murasaki through their Kadokawa Beans Bunko imprint on September 1, 2017. The light novel is licensed in North America by Yen Press. As of September 2022, ten volumes have been released.

Manga
A manga adaptation by Anko Yuzu was serialized in Kadokawa Shoten's seinen manga magazine Comp Ace from June 2018 to August 2019. It was collected in three tankōbon volumes. The manga is also licensed in North America by Yen Press.

Anime
On October 1, 2021, an anime adaptation was announced. It was later revealed to be a television series produced by Maho Film and directed by Kumiko Habara, with scripts written by Kenta Ihara, and character designs handled by Momoko Makiuchi, Eri Kojima, and Yūko Ōba. The music is composed by Natsumi Tabuchi, Hanae Nakamura, Miki Sakurai, Sayaka Aoki, and Kanade Sakuma. It aired from October 1 to December 17, 2022, on Tokyo MX, MBS, Wowow, AT-X, and BS-TBS. Crunchyroll licensed the series outside of Asia, and have streamed an English dub starting on October 15, 2022. Medialink also licensed the series across Asia-Pacific.

Reception
Rebecca Silverman of Anime News Network said of the first volume of the light novel: "It isn't wholly innovative, but Aileen's growing awareness that she's actively rewriting the plot is good, and the novel just gets better as it goes on." She praised the illustrations and said that "Aileen's active script-flipping gives the book a real edge", but criticized its use of familiar story beats and present tense narration. She later reviewed the second and third volumes, stating: "Both books have a lot of good giggles in them, with the ducks being a highlight across both volumes. The epilogue to volume three is a delightful comedy of errors ... and Aileen, although at times unbelievably dense, is mostly a very engaging heroine."

Notes

References

External links
 at Shōsetsuka ni Narō 
 
 

2017 Japanese novels
Anime and manga based on light novels
Crunchyroll anime
Fiction about reincarnation
Isekai anime and manga
Isekai novels and light novels
Kadokawa Beans Bunko
Kadokawa Dwango franchises
Kadokawa Shoten manga
Light novels
Light novels first published online
Maho Film
Medialink
Seinen manga
Shōsetsuka ni Narō
Tokyo MX original programming
Yen Press titles